The Combined Cadet Force (CCF) is a youth organisation in the United Kingdom, sponsored by the Ministry of Defence (MOD), which operates in schools, and normally includes Army, Royal Navy and Royal Air Force sections. Its aim is to "provide a disciplined organisation in a school so that pupils may develop powers of leadership by means of training to promote the qualities of responsibility, self reliance, resourcefulness, endurance and perseverance".

One of its objectives is "to encourage those who have an interest in the services to become Officers of the Regular or Reserve Forces", and a significant number of British military officers have had experience in the CCF.

Before 1948, cadet forces in schools existed as the junior division of the Officers' Training Corps framework, but in 1948 Combined Cadet Force was formed covering cadets affiliated to all three services. As of 2019, there were 42,720 cadets and 3,370 Adult Volunteers. The MOD provides approximately £28M per year of funding to the CCF. There are approximately 500 contingents (the name for each school or college's CCF) in the UK. 

Although sponsored by the Ministry of Defence, the CCF is not part of the British Armed Forces or Reserve Forces, as such, cadets are not subject to military 'call up'. Some cadets do, however, go on to join the armed forces later in life, and many of the organisation's leaders have been cadets or have a military background.

History 
On 12 May 1859, the Secretary of State for War, Jonathan Peel, sent out a circular letter to the public schools and universities inviting them to form units of the Volunteer Corps. The first school cadet corps was established at Rossall School in February 1860, initially as an army contingent only. Felsted already had an armed drill contingent at the time of the War Office letter under the command of Sgt. Major Rogers RM; its claim on these grounds to be the oldest school corps was upheld by Field Marshal Earl Roberts in a letter to the Headmaster of 1904. In February 1861 the Oxford City Rifle Cadet Corps was founded, with five companies, the first of which was composed of pupils of the Linden House School, a private school in Headington, and the second composed of pupils from Magdalen College School. In 1908, the units were re-titled the Officer Training Corps (OTC).

The CCF was created in 1948 by the amalgamation of the Junior Training Corps (formerly the Junior Division of the Officers Training Corps) and the school contingents of the Sea Cadet Corps and Air Training Corps. CCFs are still occasionally referred to as "The Corps".
A school contingent may have any combination of Royal Navy, Army, Royal Air Force and sometimes Royal Marines sections, the army section is almost invariably the largest.

Independent and state schools 
The CCF movement used to be dominated by the independent sector with 200 contingents being based in independent schools with only around 60 in state schools. Since the Cadet Expansion Programme was launched the number of contingents has reached 500, beating the target set by the government. There are now more contingents in the state sector than in the independent sector. The expansion was funded by £50m from the fines arising from the LIBOR scandal.

It was reported in 2008 that some independent school CCF detachments would be opened to pupils of local state schools One case of a fee-charging school allowing state school pupils to join the cadet force was Aldenham School in Watford, Hertfordshire linking its Cadet Force with the nearby state school Queen's to form a joint Cadet force.

Investigation into sexual abuse 
In 2012 payouts made to victims of sexual abuse across all Cadet Forces, including the CCF, totalled £1,475,844. In 2013 payouts totalled £64,782, and in 2014 payouts totalled £544,213.

Identity 
CCF Contingents are part of the CCF, but are also part of their own school and as such are semi-autonomous organisations, run by internal school or school-related staff, supported by armed forces personnel. Army sections may wear their own capbadge, this might consist of the school or college logo or crest. However, Army headgear is worn with this capbadge. Royal Navy and Royal Air Force sections wear the appropriate RN/RAF other rank and officer capbadges.

The CCF is separate from the Community Cadet Forces namely the Sea Cadet Corps, the Army Cadet Force and the Air Training Corps, and the Volunteer Cadet Corps. Pupils normally join at the age of 12 or 13 (Year 8), or later at the discretion of the Head, with both sexes able to take part.

Uniform

Royal Navy Section 

They may be issued with combat uniform if required and some schools have No 1 uniform for senior cadets. Number 3 uniform is normally the parade uniform for the CCF (RN) and consists of a white shirt, black tie, blue trousers, and blue heavy wool jersey, worn with plain black shoes; a brassard (armband) should be worn on the right arm, displaying qualification badges. Number 4 uniform is the standard working uniform of the Royal Navy, in one form or another it has been in existence for over 60 years. This uniform is fire-retardant and consists of a blue shirt, blue trousers, blue heavy wool jersey, beret, with CCF badge and black boots.

Royal Marines Section 
Royal Marines sections wear the bronzed Royal Marines cap badge of other ranks with a red "tombstone" backing on a blue beret with MTP (Multi-Terrain Pattern) clothing, and either brown or black boots. They may also wear a version of No.1 Ceremonial Uniform with Cadet insignia for special occasions.

Army Section 

Working uniform

The Army Section dress regulations are set out in Army Dress Regulations, Part 8 (Cadets). and Cadets wear the No. 8 Combat Dress - Multi-Terrain Pattern (MTP) uniform ('combats') for most occasions.

All cadets wear a rank slide with the word "CADET" in embroidered red capital letters at the top, any rank is then shown underneath in black. Cadets may be given permission to wear a stable belt of CCF, school, or affiliated unit pattern. Cadet Force Adult Volunteers (CFAVs) wear rank slides with "CCF" underneath.

Tactical Recognition Flashes are not to be worn by CFAVs or cadets of the Combined Cadet Force, irrespective of any affiliation to a Corps or Regiment. Cadets and CFAVs do wear county and contingent flashes. However, CFAVs can wear two shoulder flashes. One is the CCF logo (in purple) and the other is the School/Contingent flash.

Ceremonial uniform

No. 2 Dress (also known as Future Army Dress (FAD)) may be worn for ceremonial (e.g. Remembrance Days) or other relevant uses (such as drill or duty cadets) and is to be worn in accordance with the dress regulations mentioned above.

Evening Dress

Mess Dress is also worn, by CFAVs only and at personal expense only, it is not an issued item. Rank (depending on regimental custom) is sometimes worn, but a "CCF" pin must be worn.

Royal Air Force Section 

RAF cadets wear a version of the RAF No.2 dress. This consists of either light blue shirt and tie or a dark "working" blue shirt, blue-grey trousers (male cadets) or skirt/slacks (female cadets), a blue-grey jumper: V-neck or round neck version, and an RAF blue beret with the RAF cap badge. They also wear a brassard to distinguish themselves as cadets. Except for the cap badge and brassard badge, this is identical to the uniform of the ATC and regulations for its wear can be found in AP1358C. Most RAF sections wear combat clothing, formerly the CS95 DPM standard, but many now wear Multi-terrain pattern uniform (MTP). Officers wear the RAF tactical recognition flash, Adult Warrant Officers and Senior Non-Commissioned Officers wear the RAFAC Staff formation flash, and cadets wear RAFAC Cadet formation flash.

Cadets 

The MOD Sponsored Cadet Forces Statistics are published annually. Statistics are provided for the Community Cadets (the Sea Cadet Corps and Volunteer Cadet Corps (VCC), Army Cadet Force (ACF) and Air Training Corps (ATC)) and the Combined Cadet Force. The Volunteer Cadet Corps (VCC) is included in these statistics for the first time, as its status changed to become the fifth MOD sponsored cadet force in 2017.

Number of CCF Cadets (nationwide) 
The strength of CCF, both Cadets and CFAVs is published every year by the Office for National Statistics, usually in April.

In November 2019 the Government announced that it had achieved its target of 500 contingents under the Cadet Expansion Programme (CEP)

Cadet ranks 

Most cadet ranks are standard non-commissioned ranks, prefixed by "Cadet". The highest rank depends on the size of the contingent, but are usually Cadet Regimental Sergeant Major, (Army and RM Sections) and Cadet Warrant Officer (RN and RAF Sections). 
Some contingents may have Junior (and sometimes Senior) Under Officers. Cadet Under Officers' rank badges are blue bands 12 mm wide across each shoulder slide, with the addition of the letters CCF underneath.

Cadets are promoted on their level of experience and their level of commitment to the cadet force. Also cadets are promoted on excellent or merit. Senior cadet's duty is to help the running of parades etc and to help their Contingent Commander or another officer of their contingent.

The Naval Cadet that is in command of the naval section is also addressed as Coxswain.

Army cadets ranks share associated regiment's equivalent rank title (e.g. Corporal in the Royal Artillery becomes Bombardier.)

Cadet Force adult volunteers (CFAV) 
Cadet Force Adult Volunteers (CFAVs), who are the uniformed civilian staff that work in the school contingents, provide training to the cadets. Unlike the other cadet organisations (ATC/SCC/ACF), most adult volunteers are commissioned officers, the exception often being the School Staff Instructor (see below) and the newer position of Sergeant Instructor (SI).

CCF Officers 
CCF officers are not members of the armed forces and are usually teachers or other school staff. As such they are not subject to military law, but are subject to CCF Regulations they are subordinate to officers in the Armed Forces whether Regular or Reserve. Until 2017 CCF (Army) and CCF (RAF) officers were in special categories of the reserves of their service whereas CCF (RN) Officers were 'appointed' and did not hold commissions. However, on 1 December 2017, the Cadet Forces Commission was introduced and since then this type of commission has been held by all CCF officers.

Training 
 Officers in the Naval section of the CCF, undertake the six day CCF Royal Navy officer induction course training at Britannia Royal Naval College, Dartmouth. It is commanded by a course officer (regular Naval Service) and at least two CFAVs to assist. The training is delivered by regular sailors.
 Unlike officers in the Army Cadet Force, CCF (Army) officers do not attend the Cadet Forces Commissions Board of the Army Officer Selection Board and are commissioned based on recommendation from the Headmaster of the employing school and confirmed by the relevant Army Brigade. Prospective officers may be appointed as an "Adult Under Officer", awaiting commissioning.
 CCF (RAF) officers attend the Officer and Aircrew Selection Centre and undertake the five day RAF Air Cadets Officers' Initial Course at RAF College Cranwell, as officer cadets. Upon successful completion of the course, they are awarded their Cadet Forces Commission. Their rank slides are similar to their RAF counterparts, with the addition of the text 'RAF Air Cadets' underneath the displayed rank.

All CCF adult induction/basic/initial courses cover the basic skills needed for CFAVs who wish to serve in the CCF, such as drill and turnout, leadership and teamwork tasks, weapon training, navigation, etc.

School Staff Instructors (SSI) 
Supporting officers in the running of the Contingent is the School Staff Instructor (SSI) - usually a retired Senior Non-commissioned Officer (SNCO) or Warrant Officer. Although they are civilians, they retain their rank (without "CCF" titles) as a courtesy and are employed by the school to instruct and assist in the running of the Contingent.

Whilst the majority of the SSIs are (former) SNCOs it is also possible for them to be a Cadet Forces commissioned officer. There is usually only one SSI per Contingent and they are also supported by other external staff, including the RN's Area Instructors, various Brigade Cadet Training Teams (CTTs) and RAF TEST SNCOs.

Civilian Instructors (CI) 
Like the community cadet forces, some Contingents may have one or more Civilian Instructors (CI). These are adult volunteers who may instruct in either a specialist (first aid, signals, etc.) or more generalised role when the establishment level of officers does not include sufficient suitably qualified and experienced personnel to teach these subjects. Many are members of staff at the school.

Adult Non-commissioned Officers (NCO) 
In 2018 the role of Sergeant Instructor (SI) was introduced for CCF (Army) sections, this is the first occasion that adults other than SSIs have been appointed as an NCO rather than a commissioned rank in the CCF. Similarly to the ACF the role of the SI is to support the CCF officers. Whilst not holding a commission. SIs are uniformed, paid for their activities, have to undertake vetting/background checks and the CCF Basic Course at Cadet Training Centre Frimley Park.

Sergeant Instructors (SIs) were introduced into the CCF Army Section to provide an alternative route for CFAVs who did not wish to commission at the time of joining. When the SI route was created in the CCF Army Section there was no promotion route available with an assumption made that the CFAVs would ultimately commission; however, this is now known not to be the case.

On 1 January 2020 the rules were amended to allow SIs to progress to the rank of Staff Sergeant Instructor 2 years from completion of their CCF Basic Course, provided that they had also completed one or more additional qualifications. The qualification list is across a range of military and non-military subjects aligning with that of the ACF to encourage cooperation and movement between the 2 branches of the Army's cadets.

Adult Strength 
The strength of CCF CFAVs is published every year by the Office for National Statistics, usually in April. At 1 April 2020 it was:

Officer ranks 
CCF (RN) ranks are almost the same as for RN (and RNR) officers (with the post-nominals '(CCF) RNR' used only in writing, not on insignia) but their rank braid is 'wavy' as used in the past by the RNVR.

CCF (Army) officers are required to wear a "CCF" title on their rank slides, epaulettes, or other part of their uniform as appropriate in addition to any insignia of affiliated Army regiment or corps. Some contingents may also have the school or college name on rank slides. 

CCF (RAF) Officers wear 'RAF Air Cadets' on their rank sides, as although they are CCF, they are part of the wider Air Cadets family. 

Since the introduction of the Cadet Forces Commission, ranks do not indicate membership of the British Armed Forces.

Cadet training 
Each of the CCF sections have different syllabi with a degree of overlap. All the sections learn drill and all cadets are trained to fire the L98A2 5.56 mm Cadet General Purpose rifle, a semi-automatic only version of the L85A2 used by the UK armed forces. There are also opportunities to fire the L144 A1 Cadet Small Bore Target Rifle (CSBTR) and the L81 Cadet Target Rifle.

Royal Navy section 

Cadets in the Royal Navy section receive instruction in boat-work and other naval subjects (including flying with the Fleet Air Arm). The Royal Navy also offers many CCF courses during the school holidays which are open to any members of any CCF.

Royal Marine Section 
The Royal Marines section, although a part of the Navy, tend to train independently, covering battle drills, weapons handling and marksmanship, fieldcraft, camouflage and concealment and the history of the Royal Marines.

Army section 
The Army section follows the Army Proficiency Certificate (APC) subjects such as drill and turnout, skill at arms, shooting, map and compass, fieldcraft and first aid.

Royal Air Force section 
As CCF (RAF) sections form part of the larger Royal Air Force Air Cadets, they are eligible to undertake the same syllabus and training opportunities as the Air Training Corps:

RAF section cadets are given the opportunity to fly in both powered aircraft, most notably the Grob Tutor and in unpowered gliders such as the Grob Viking; their training and flying courses are identical to those available to members of the Air Training Corps. Cadets can also be involved in a multitude of battle training and tactics as well as opportunities to fly in various aircraft from the RAF and allied nations. The section also learn about aerospace management, aircraft structure and propulsion, engineering, air power doctrine as well as an opportunity to see how most RAF stations, sections and wings or squadrons operate. As well as practical learning, RAF cadets also follow an academic syllabus. Cadets are usually taught "Part 1" before being expected to complete Parts 2 - 4 by themselves through the medium of Ultilearn. Completing Part 4, also known as the Master Cadet Award, leads to a BTEC Level 2 in Aviation Studies being awarded, although CCF cadets, unlike those in the ATC, have to pay to receive this BTEC.

Further training 
All sections can undertake leadership courses at Cadet Training Centre, Frimley Park, Nesscliffe, or RAF Cranwell, as well as adventurous training. There are also other courses available for cadets to enhance their skills, such as Junior and Senior Cadet Instructor Courses (JCIC, SCIC) and Method of Instruction (MOI).

See also 
Elements of the Community Cadet Forces
 Sea Cadet Corps
 Army Cadet Force
 Air Training Corps
Other MoD sponsored or recognized cadet forces
 Volunteer Cadet Corps
Related articles
 Cadet#UK
 Cadet Vocational Qualification Organisation (CVQO)
 National Association of Training Corps for Girls
 Reserve Forces and Cadets Association
 Bermuda Cadet Corps

Similar organizations in other countries 
  Antigua and Barbuda Cadet Corps
  Australian Air Force Cadets
  Australian Army Cadets
  Australian Navy Cadets
  Bangladesh National Cadet Corps
  Royal Belgian Sea Cadet Corps
  Bermuda Sea Cadet Corps
  Lithuanian Riflemen's Union
  National Cadet Corps (Ghana)
  National Cadet Corps (India)
  National Cadet Corps (Singapore)
  Gadna military training
  Hong Kong Adventure Corps
  Hong Kong Air Cadet Corps
  Hong Kong Army Cadets Association Limited
  Hong Kong Sea Cadet Corps
  Cadet Colleges in Pakistan
  Citizenship Advancement Training
  Royal Canadian Air Cadets
  Royal Canadian Army Cadets
  Royal Canadian Sea Cadets
  United States Reserve Officers' Training Corps
  United States Junior Reserve Officers' Training Corps
  Cadet Corps of Russia
  Young Army Cadets National Movement

References

External links 

 
 Army Dress Regulations Part 8 (Cadets) (2013)

British Cadet organisations
1948 establishments in the United Kingdom